Blackwell–Tonkawa Municipal Airport  is a public use airport located in Kay County, Oklahoma, United States. The airport is five nautical miles (9 km) southwest of the central business district of Blackwell, Oklahoma and is owned by the cities of Blackwell and Tonkawa.

Although most U.S. airports use the same three-letter location identifier for the FAA and IATA, this airport is assigned BKN by the FAA and BWL by the IATA (which assigned BKN to Balkanabat Airport in Balkanabat, Turkmenistan).

Facilities and aircraft 
It has one runway designated 17/35 with an asphalt surface measuring 3,501 by 60 feet (1,067 x 18 m).

For the 12-month period ending May 6, 2008, the airport had 2,400 general aviation aircraft operations, an average of 200 per month. At that time there were 15 aircraft based at this airport: 100% single-engine.

References

External links 
 Blackwell–Tonkawa Municipal Airport page at Oklahoma Aeronautics Commission website
 Aerial photo as of 20 February 1995 from USGS The National Map
 

Airports in Oklahoma
Buildings and structures in Kay County, Oklahoma